Daniel Huger (February 20, 1742July 6, 1799) was an American planter and statesman from Berkeley County, South Carolina.

Early life
His grandfather was Daniel Huger Sr (1651–1711), a French Huguenot who was born in Loudun, France and settled in Charleston.

Career
Daniel Huger was a delegate for South Carolina to the Continental Congress from 1786 to 1788 and a United States representative from 1789 to 1793. He owned slaves.

Personal life

Daniel Huger's wife was the sister of the wife of Lewis Morris, Jr., the son of New York Congressman Lewis Morris.  His son, Daniel Elliott Huger, would later serve in the United States Senate for South Carolina and marry a daughter of Arthur Middleton.

Descendants
Mary Procter Huger, his great-granddaughter through his son Daniel, was the wife of Confederate General Arthur Middleton Manigault, who was of Huguenot descent himself; likewise a nephew of Daniel Elliot Huger was Confederate General Benjamin Huger.

References

External links

1742 births
1799 deaths
People from Berkeley County, South Carolina
South Carolina colonial people
American people of French descent
Continental Congressmen from South Carolina
Pro-Administration Party members of the United States House of Representatives from South Carolina
American planters
American slave owners